London Spirit are a franchise 100-ball cricket side based in North London. The team represents the historic counties of Middlesex, Essex and Northamptonshire in The Hundred, which took place for the first time during the 2021 English and Welsh cricket season. Both the men's and women's sides play their home games at Lord's.

History 

The announcement of the new eight-team men's and women's tournament series in 2019 was not without controversy, with the likes of Virat Kohli criticising the England and Wales Cricket Board for pursuing a shift away from Test cricket, while others argued the format should have followed the established and successful Twenty20 format. The ECB however decided it needed a more unique format to draw crowds.

In August 2019 the side announced that former Australian spinner Shane Warne would be the men's team's first coach, while former Australia Women coach Lisa Keightley was appointed coach of the Women's team.

The inaugural Hundred draft took place in October 2019 and saw the Spirit claim Rory Burns as their headline men's draftee, and Heather Knight as the women's headliner. They are joined by England One-Day captain Eoin Morgan and Essex's Dan Lawrence for the men's team, while Freya Davies joins Knight in the women's side.

Honours

Men's honours 

The Hundred
Third place: 2022

Women's honours 

The Hundred
4th place: 2021 (highest finish)

Ground 

Both the London Spirit men's and women's sides play at the home of Cricket, Lord's, in the St. John's Wood area of London. The women's side had been due to play at the home of Essex County Cricket Club, the County Ground in Chelmsford, and the home of Northamptonshire, the County Ground in Northampton but both teams were brought together at the same ground as a result of the Covid-19 pandemic.

Players

Current squad

Men's side 
 Bold denotes players with international caps.
  denotes a player who is unavailable for rest of the season.

Men's captains
 Italics denote a temporary captain when the main captain was unavailable.

Women's side 
 Bold denotes players with international caps.
  denotes a player who is unavailable for rest of the season.

Women's captains
 Italics denote a temporary captain when the main captain was unavailable.

Seasons

Group stages

Knockout rounds

See also 

 List of London Spirit cricketers
 List of cricket grounds in England and Wales
 List of Test cricket grounds

References

Further reading 

 BBC: The Hundred player draft – covering the first draft signings for each region's team

External links 

 Official web page

Middlesex County Cricket Club
Essex County Cricket Club
Northamptonshire County Cricket Club
Cricket in Middlesex
Cricket in Essex
Cricket in Northamptonshire
Sport in London
Sport in Chelmsford
Sport in Northampton
The Hundred (cricket) teams
2019 establishments in England
London Spirit